This is a list of submissions to the 31st Academy Awards for Best Foreign Language Film. The Academy Award for Best Foreign Language Film was created in 1956 by the Academy of Motion Picture Arts and Sciences to honour non-English-speaking films produced outside the United States. The award is handed out annually, and is accepted by the winning film's director, although it is considered an award for the submitting country as a whole. Countries are invited by the Academy to submit their best films for competition according to strict rules, with only one film being accepted from each country.

For the 31st Academy Awards, ten films were submitted in the category Academy Award for Best Foreign Language Film. The United Arab Republic (Egypt) and Yugoslavia submitted films to the competition for the first time. The highlighted titles were the five nominated films, which came from France, Italy, Spain, West Germany and Yugoslavia. France won its first-ever contested Foreign Language Oscar for My Uncle (Mon Oncle), a comedy with little dialogue.

Submissions

References

Sources
 Margaret Herrick Library, Academy of Motion Picture Arts and Sciences

31